William Alphonsus Scott (1871–1921) was an Irish Roman Catholic ecclesiastical architectural historian, academic, and architect active throughout late—nineteenth-century and early twentieth-century Ireland. His offices were first located in Drogheda, later located at 45 Mountjoy Square, Dublin.

Career
Scott was apprenticed to Thomas Newenham Deane in the early 1890s. Deane was Superintendent of National Monuments. He worked in London from 1899 to 1902 and was there influenced by the Arts & Crafts movement. His ecclesiastical work, mostly for Catholic churches, was influenced by  Early Irish Christian and Byzantine architecture. In 1911, he was appointed Chair of Architecture at University College, Dublin, succeeding the eminent Sir Thomas Drew. Much of his was completed by fellow academic Rudolf Maximilian Butler (1872–1943), then of 23 Kildare Street, Dublin.

Scott is also credited with the restoration and furniture design for Thoor Ballylee, the country residence of the poet William Butler Yeats.

Personal life
Scott married Kate Crumley, daughter of Patrick, in Enniskillen on 4 September 1900.

Works
1910 Repair and renovation on the Catholic and Protestant Chapels at St. Davnet's Hospital, Monaghan, Co. Monaghan.
Talbots Inch Village, Kilkenny. Commissioned by Ellen Cuffe, Countess of Desart.

References

1871 births
1921 deaths
20th-century Irish architects
Architects from Dublin (city)
Irish ecclesiastical architects
Academics of University College Dublin
Architects of Roman Catholic churches
Architecture academics
Architectural historians